Simon Holloway is an English fashion designer and Artistic Director. As of January 2022, he is the current Creative Director at James Purdey & Sons, or simply Purdey, owned by luxury goods holding company Compagnie Financière Richemont SA.

Career
Holloway’s fashion career began in Paris in the 1990s, where he interned at Chloé for current Chanel designer Virginie Viard. Then, he moved to the United States in 1994, when he began designing menswear for the Australian-born, L.A.-based Richard Tyler. Julie Verhoeven, whom he hired at Richard Tyler, remembered the period like a fever dream: It was “highly charged—extensive collections, travel, fashion shows, fittings and late nights.” A subsequent tenure for Holloway in New York for Narciso Rodriguez was followed by a time with Ralph Lauren, with whom he worked closely on the womenswear collection from 2004 to 2007.

In 2010, he was made Creative Director of Jimmy Choo. Then, he managed the brand in preparing for the sale from Towerbrook to Labelux for $900 million, including the successful launch of the house's first Men's collection and inaugural fragrance launch.

Holloway joined the Italian fashion fabric supplier and fashion house Agnona as Creative Director in 2015. To celebrate his fall 2016 collection, Holloway made a short film, Await, with Luca Guadagnino’s partner and assistant director, Ferdinando Cito Filomarino, starring the model Malgosia Bela. Luke Leitch for Vogue wrote of the Spring 2017 Ready-To-Wear "It’s hard to argue with a collection full of clothes beautifully made to be beautiful that succeeds as well as this. The only possible caveats to proffer are that a) this uptown cracker of a collection from Simon Holloway will almost certainly be fiendishly expensive (I felt a sense of impending doom just to be near a double-faced, tortoise-shell-detailed jacket in Agnona's finest gauge cashmere) and b) this was not a collection that said much apart from “I am very rich and beautiful, and I am dressed accordingly.”

In a 2019 interview with Vogue Runway's Tiziana Cardini, he explained how he improved the label's responsible sourcing for the PreFall 2020 collection. "In reality, we already start on a very good base in terms of responsible use of fabrics,” he explained. “Nearly everything in our collections has always been natural.” In further sustainability efforts, Agnona is addressing more responsible sourcing of synthetic yarns. Cotton shirting is also almost completely organic and responsibly farmed. The polyester blended into wools to make the fabric stretch has been replaced with recycled polyester; and the nylon used for the inside of quilted jackets is now only recycled.
 
Suzy Menkes for Vogue said of Holloway's Fall/Winter 2020 first dual-gender collection for Agnona: "The designer seems exceptional in that he does not chase rocker or street styles, but rather a youthful smartness.” “The show was presented in an empty area, with only pillars to break the space in which the models walked at a leisurely pace. The quiet colours and tailored shapes – drawn as if with a compass rather than a set square – produced a fine collection of tailoring for both sexes. As the models walked quietly by in wrap coats, sky-blue cardigans, and jackets that seemed as soft as shawls, the clothes seemed elegantly reassuring: calm clothes for tough times.”

Holloway's first Men's wear collection for Agnona was Fall/Winter 2020. GQ style editor Teo van den Broeke announced “Agnona, the new daddy of all cashmere brands" and went onto say “Appointed at the Ermenegildo Zegna-owned womenswear brand in 2015, Holloway – who has previous at Hogan, Ralph Lauren and Jimmy Choo – has in the past five years imbued Agnona with enough slouchy sophistication to put it on par with its haute luxury Italian cousins Loro Piana and Brunello Cucinelli (no small feat).”

References

1971 births
Living people
English fashion designers